The Museum of Archaeology and Ethnography is a museum in Baku, Azerbaijan, that was established in 1976. It bears the name of the Azerbaijani architect-Mikayil Huseynov. The museum has two parts. The ethnography section displays materials related to the 19th century and early 20th century, as well as the life of Azerbaijani people.

The archaeology section exhibits findings covering all stages of Azerbaijani's historical development, its culture from the Stone Age to the late Middle Ages.

The museum's exhibitions give detailed information about the sites of primitive people, living houses on the territory of Azerbaijan, settlements belonging to cattle breeders and farmers, historical and material culture of ancient states, gravestone monuments, Azerbaijani arts of ancient times, economy, lifestyle, moral values of ancestors of the Azerbaijani people.

In 2008 the museum underwent restoration works and increased the number of its exhibitions to 2000.

The building 
It was built at the beginning of the 20th century and called "Chained House". In 1920, this property belonged to the merchant Haji Mammadhuseyn Mammadov. In 1928, Melikov's brothers, who were considered the renowned merchants of the Icherisheher, took this property. In 1930, the Baku Customs Office confiscated this property for smuggling and gave it to the state. Since 1930, a sewing factory named after N.Narimanov has been set up. As the establishment of sewing factory, changes have been made in the facade and some architectural elements have been taken. Malikov brothers were the last owner of the property, thus this building is known as the House of Melikov brothers. The facade of the building, facing Gosha Gala Gates divides the main street into the left and right to the Great Gala and Tower Streets. The architectural style and artistic aesthetic appearance of the chain building occupy a place within the architectural monuments built in the Icheri Sheher early in the twentieth century.

References

1976 establishments in Azerbaijan
Museums established in 1976
Museums in Baku
History museums in Azerbaijan
Archaeological museums in Azerbaijan
Ethnographic museums in Azerbaijan